Kyle McCord (born September 19, 2002) is an American football quarterback for the Ohio State Buckeyes.

Early life and high school career
McCord grew up in Mount Laurel, New Jersey and attended St. Joseph's Preparatory School in Philadelphia, Pennsylvania. He received his first college scholarship offer from Central Michigan before the start of his freshman year of high school. As a sophomore, he passed for a school-record 2,883 yards and 35 touchdown passes. McCord passed for 2,399 yards and 31 touchdowns during his junior season before missing the final four games due to injury. He was named the Pennsylvania Gatorade Player of the Year as a senior after completing 65 percent of his passes while throwing for 1,582 yards and 21 touchdowns. McCord finished his high school career with 6,887 passing yards, a Philadelphia Catholic League record, and 88 touchdown passes.

McCord was initially rated a four-star recruit and committed to play college football at Ohio State during his sophomore year over offers from Texas A&M, Penn State, Mississippi State, and Michigan State. He was later reranked as a five-star prospect by 247Sports as a junior.

College career
McCord primarily spent his freshman season at Ohio State as the backup to starter C. J. Stroud. He made one start against Akron while Stroud was recovering from a shoulder injury.  In the game, McCord completed 13 of 18 passing attempts for 319 yards and two touchdowns with one interception in a 59-7 win and was named the Big Ten Conference Freshman of the Week. He finished the season with 416 passing yards and two touchdown passes and two interceptions in five games played. McCord entered his sophomore season as the Buckeyes second string quarterback.

Personal life
McCord's father, Derek McCord, played quarterback at Rutgers from 1988 to 1992.

References

External links
Ohio State Buckeyes bio

Living people
Players of American football from New Jersey
American football quarterbacks
Ohio State Buckeyes football players
St. Joseph's Preparatory School alumni
Sportspeople from Burlington County, New Jersey
2002 births